Arcynopteryx is a genus of insects belonging to the family Perlodidae.

The species of this genus are found in Europe and Northern America.

Species:
 Arcynopteryx amurensis Zhiltzova & Levanidova, 1978 
 Arcynopteryx angarensis Teslenko & Zhiltzova, 2012

References

Perlodidae
Plecoptera genera